Sandalio Calderon (born 19 October 1952) is a Colombian boxer. He competed in the men's featherweight event at the 1976 Summer Olympics. He lost in the opening round of the competition to Angel Pacheco of Venezuela.

References

1952 births
Living people
Colombian male boxers
Olympic boxers of Colombia
Boxers at the 1976 Summer Olympics
Place of birth missing (living people)
Featherweight boxers
20th-century Colombian people